Complete II is a box set released October 1, 2005. On ten CDs and nine DVDs it collects all studio and live albums, and all DVDs that X Japan released after changing their name from X, along with two DVDs containing previously unreleased and rare material from the band's earlier career. It reached number 92 on the Oricon chart.

CDs 
 Art of Life
 Dahlia
 Live Live Live Tokyo Dome 1993-1996 (2 discs)
 Live Live Live Extra
 Live in Hokkaido 1995.12.4 Bootleg
 Art of Life Live
 The Last Live (3 discs)

DVDs 
 Dahlia the Video Visual Shock#5 Part I and Part II
 Dahlia Tour Final 1996 (2 discs)
 X Japan Clips II
 The Last Live Video (2 discs)
 Art of Life 1993.12.31 Tokyo Dome
 X Film Gig 1993 Visual Shock Kougeki Saikai (previously unreleased)
 "Prologue ~ World Anthem" (S.E.)
 "Silent Jealousy"
 "Sadistic Desire"
 "Stab Me in the Back"
 "Week End"
 "Celebration"
 "Drum Solo"
 "Art of Life"
 "Kurenai"
 "Orgasm"
 "Endless Rain"
 "Joker"
 "X"
 "Say Anything" (S.E.)
 Super Rare Clips 1987 Xclamation - Kurenai (previously limited released in 1987 and again in 1988)
 "Xclamation"
 "Stab Me in the Back"
 "Kurenai"

References 

Complete II
Complete II
Complete II
2005 video albums
Live video albums
Music video compilation albums
2005 live albums
2005 compilation albums